Frankie Alexander King (born June 6, 1972) is an American former professional basketball player. During his pro club career, at a height of 6 ft 1 (1.85 m) tall, and a weight of 185 lbs. (84 kg), he played at the point guard and shooting guard positions. King played in the NBA, with the Los Angeles Lakers and Philadelphia 76ers.

College career
King attended Appling County High, in Baxley, Georgia, where he played high school basketball. After high shcool, King played college basketball at the former Brunswick College, which is now known as the College of Coastal Georgia, from 1991 to 1993. He then played college basketball at Western Carolina University. At Western Carolina, he played with the school's men's team, the Western Carolina Catamounts, from 1993 to 1995.

King was inducted into the Western Carolina Athletics Hall of Fame in 2013. In 2021, he was named to the Southern Conference's men's basketball 100 years anniversary team.

Professional career
In the 1995 NBA Draft, King was selected in the second round, with the 37th overall draft pick, by the Los Angeles Lakers. He played with the Lakers, in the 1995–96 season, and with the Philadelphia 76ers, in the 1996–97 season. King's NBA career consisted of a total of thirteen games played, six with the Lakers and seven with the 76ers.

After playing in the NBA, King also played professionally in numerous European countries: Spain, Greece, Germany, France, Turkey, and Cyprus. He also professionally played in Asia (Israel), and in South America (Venezuela).

References

External links
Frankie King @ NBA.com
Frankie King @ Basketball-Reference.com
Frankie King @ Eurobasket.com
Frankie King @ ProBallers.com
Frankie King @ RealGM.com
Frankie King @ Sports-Reference.com
Frankie King @ TheDraftReview.com
Frankie King @ CatamountSports.com

1972 births
Living people
20th-century African-American sportspeople
21st-century African-American sportspeople
AEL Limassol B.C. players
African-American basketball players
Alba Berlin players
American expatriate basketball people in Cyprus
American expatriate basketball people in France
American expatriate basketball people in Germany
American expatriate basketball people in Greece
American expatriate basketball people in Israel
American expatriate basketball people in Spain
American expatriate basketball people in Turkey
American expatriate basketball people in Venezuela
American men's basketball players
APOEL B.C. players
Aris B.C. players
Basketball players from Georgia (U.S. state)
BCM Gravelines players
CB Granada players
Galatasaray S.K. (men's basketball) players
Greek Basket League players
Ironi Ramat Gan players
Israeli Basketball Premier League players
Junior college men's basketball players in the United States
Liga ACB players
Los Angeles Lakers draft picks
Los Angeles Lakers players
Panionios B.C. players
P.A.O.K. BC players
Paris Racing Basket players
People from Baxley, Georgia
Philadelphia 76ers players
Point guards
Shooting guards
Western Carolina Catamounts men's basketball players